General elections were held in Burma between 6 and 20 October 1985. The country was a one-party state at the time, with the Burma Socialist Programme Party (BSPP) as the sole legal party. The BSPP won all 489 seats in the People's Assembly. The elections were the last to be held before the 8888 Uprising, the dissolution of the BSPP and the abolition of the People's Assembly.

Results

References

1985 in Burma
Elections in Myanmar
Burma
One-party elections
Election and referendum articles with incomplete results